David William Lodge is an American voice actor who works for anime as well as animation and the video game community and is known for his voice work in the Power Rangers franchise. Two of his best-known voice roles there were as Villamax in Power Rangers Lost Galaxy and Loki in Power Rangers Lightspeed Rescue. In anime, he voiced Kenpachi Zaraki in Bleach and  Jiraiya in Naruto. In animation, he provides the voice of Luxor in Tutenstein and Tenderheart Bear in the 2010s Care Bears cartoons. In video games, he voices a variety of roles, especially in World of Warcraft.

Filmography

Anime

Animation

Films

Video games

References

External links 
 
 
 

Year of birth missing (living people)
Living people
American male voice actors
American male video game actors
20th-century American male actors
21st-century American male actors